Wild Basin a region in the southeast corner Rocky Mountain National Park in Colorado, United States. The primary entrance is located north of Allenspark off State Highway 7.

A dirt road leads to a ranger station, parking and horseback or hiking trails. The trail to Bluebird Lake and Ouzel Lake follows the North St. Vrain Creek (which is a tributary of the South Platte River) passing Calypso Cascades and Ouzel Falls along the way, leading to Ouzel Lake and Bluebird Lake. Both Ouzel Falls and Ouzel Lake are named after a North American species of bird, Cinclus mexicanus, also known as a dipper. Other trails lead to Thunder Lake, Finch Lake, and Pear Lake.

See also
Alpine Visitor Center

Notes

References
 Chronic, Halka and Williams, Felicie; Roadside Geology of Colorado: Second Edition; Copyright 2002 by Halka Chronic and Felicie Williams; Mountain Press Publishing Company;  
 Dannen, Kent and Donna; Hiking Rocky Mountain National Park: Including Indian Peaks Wilderness: Ninth Edition; The Globe Pequot Press; Copyright 1978, 80 82 83, 85, 89, 94, 2002 by The Globe Pequot Press;

External links
Scenic drives in Rocky Mountain National Park
Hiking information and pictures along the trail to Bluebird Lake in the Wild Basin

Protected areas of Larimer County, Colorado
Protected areas of Grand County, Colorado
Rocky Mountain National Park
Colorado scenic drives